George Ladd may refer to:

George Ladd (Medal of Honor) (1828/29–1889), American Civil War Medal of Honor recipient
George Eldon Ladd (1911–1982), American theologian
George Trumbull Ladd (1842–1921), American philosopher
George W. Ladd (1818–1892), U.S. Representative from Maine
George Wells Ladd (1925–2016), American economist
George Ladd (silversmith), 19th-century American silversmith